Bückeburg is a railway station located in Bückeburg, Germany. The station was opened in 1847 and is located on the Hanover–Minden railway. The train services are operated by Deutsche Bahn and WestfalenBahn.

Train services
The station is served by the following services:

Regional services  Rheine - Osnabrück - Minden - Hanover - Braunschweig
Regional services  Bielefeld - Herford - Minden - Hanover - Braunschweig
Hannover S-Bahn services  Minden - Haste - Wunstorf - Hanover - Weetzen - Haste

References

External links
 

Railway stations in Lower Saxony
Railway stations in Germany opened in 1847
Hannover S-Bahn stations